Murd (also Romanized as Mūrd) is a village in Deh Tall Rural District, in the Central District of Bastak County, Hormozgan Province, Iran. At the 2006 census, its population was 24, in 5 families.

References 

Populated places in Bastak County